Whaddyado is an American syndicated educational television series that began airing on September 12, 2005. The show features people in real-life moral dilemmas and perilous situations to give young viewers a chance to ponder what they would do in the same situation. The show is marketed as E/I-friendly.

The series is produced and distributed by Steve Rotfeld Productions (SRP).

Reception
Common Sense Media rated the show 2 out of 5 stars.

References

External links

Steve Rotfield Productions

American educational television series
First-run syndicated television programs in the United States
2005 American television series debuts
Television series about teenagers